The 1973 South Dakota Coyotes football team was an American football team that represented the University of South Dakota as a member of the North Central Conference (NCC) during the 1973 NCAA Division II football season. Led by eighth-year head coach Joe Salem, the Coyotes compiled an overall record of 8–3 with a mark of 6–1 in conference play, sharing the NCC title with North Dakota State. South Dakota advanced to the NCAA Division II Football Championship playoffs, losing to Boise State in the quarterfinals. The team played home games at Inman Field in Vermillion, South Dakota

Schedule

References

South Dakota
South Dakota Coyotes football seasons
North Central Conference football champion seasons
South Dakota Coyotes football